When Sultan Qaboos bin Said Al Said assumed power in 1970, Oman had limited contacts with the outside world, including neighbouring Arab states. A special treaty relationship permitted the United Kingdom close involvement in Oman's civil and military affairs. Ties with the United Kingdom remained very close throughout Sultan Qaboos' reign, along with strong ties to the United States.

The Sultanate of Oman is the oldest independent state in the Arab World. It is bordered by Saudi Arabia on the western side, the United Arab Emirates (UAE) in the northwest and Yemen in the southwest. Oman has two enclaves (Madha and the Musandam peninsula) within the land borders of the UAE. Oman also has maritime borders with Iran and Pakistan. The Arabian Sea lies to Oman's southeast and the Gulf of Oman to the northeast. Although partially under Portuguese occupation during the 16th to mid-17th century, Oman had its own empire in East Africa from the early 18th to the mid-19th century. Oman has a population of 4.2 million (2018). Foreign expatriates are estimated to make up to 45 per cent of the population. Administratively, Oman is divided into six regions. Its national day, 18 November, is the birthday of the former Sultan, HM Qaboos bin Said Al-Said. Oman's capital is Muscat on the northern coast.

Political overview
Since 1970, Oman has pursued a moderate foreign policy and expanded its diplomatic relations dramatically. It supported the 1979 Camp David accords and was one of three Arab League states, along with Somalia and Sudan, which did not break relations with Egypt after the signing of the Egypt–Israel peace treaty in 1979. During the Persian Gulf crisis, Oman assisted the United Nations coalition effort. Oman has developed close ties to its neighbours; it joined the six-member Gulf Cooperation Council when it was established in 1980.

Oman has traditionally supported Middle East peace initiatives, as it did those in 1983. In April 1994, Oman hosted the plenary meeting of the Water Working Group of the peace process, the first Persian Gulf state to do so.

During the Cold War period, Oman avoided relations with communist countries because of the communist support for the insurgency in Dhofar. In recent years, Oman has undertaken diplomatic initiatives in the Central Asian republics, particularly in Kazakhstan, where it is involved in a joint oil pipeline project. In addition, Oman maintains good relations with Iran, its north-eastern neighbor across the Gulf of Oman, and the two countries regularly exchange delegations. Oman is an active member in international and regional organizations, notably the Arab League and the Gulf Cooperation Council. Its foreign policy is overseen by its Foreign Ministry.

International disputes

The northern boundary with the United Arab Emirates has not been bilaterally defined; the northern section in the Musandam Peninsula is an administrative boundary.

Bilateral relations

See also

 Iran-Arab Relations (Oman)
 List of diplomatic missions in Oman
 List of diplomatic missions of Oman
 Territorial disputes in the Persian Gulf
 Foreign Ministry (Oman)

References

External links

 Foreign Ministry of Oman

 
Politics of Oman